Deadman Creek is a stream in the U.S. state of Washington. It is a tributary of Snake River.

Deadman Creek was named in the early 1860s for an incident when two miners died of exposure in the area.

See also
List of rivers of Washington

References

Rivers of Garfield County, Washington
Rivers of Washington (state)